Lost Somewhere Between the Earth and My Home is the debut studio album by American alternative country band the Geraldine Fibbers. It was released on July 18, 1995 on Virgin Records. "Dragon Lady" was released as a promotional music video and single in June 1995.

Lyrics
The album's lyrics, written by the band's frontwoman Carla Bozulich, focus on somber topics including, but not limited to, abusive relationships and prostitution. The album's songs also discuss drug use at length, as well as the concept of loss of identity.

Music
Bozulich, in addition to writing the band's songs, also served as their lead vocalist. On this album, her voice was described by the Los Angeles Times as "raw, raspy, [and] Joplin-tinged." CMJ noted that the album's restrained, roots-rock instrumentation is virtually the polar opposite of the music Bozulich made in her previous band, Ethyl Meatplow.

Critical reception

Lost Somewhere Between the Earth and My Home received mixed to positive reviews upon its release, with some critics comparing the band to X due to their shared country-music-influenced sounds. No Depression critic Neil Weiss called it "a tough, confusing record, both thematically and musically", rooted "in the street poetics of the Hollywood underground by way of some West Virginian backwoods on a planet five times more sinister than our own."

Spin magazine named Lost Somewhere Between the Earth and My Home to their best albums of 1995 list.

More recently, other musicians have written very favorably of the album; for instance, Lydia Lunch named it one of her 13 favorite albums in 2013. A 2009 article in Magnet called the album a "lost classic", and said that on the album, "the Fibbers' warped alt-country twang haunted the City of Angels like ghosts of California country’s past, full of grinding violin and poisoned tales of junkies, madness and lost innocence." Nels Cline, who joined the Geraldine Fibbers for the recording of their second album, Butch, called Lost "a stone classic" in an interview with the Vancouver Sun in 2014. Also in 2014, Spin ranked the album as the 9th best album of 1995, and, like previous reviews of the album, compared its sound to that of X. In 2017, Al Shipley described the album as a "country feedback masterpiece", adding that it was his "...favorite rock album of the 90's."

2017 Vinyl Reissue
Jealous Butcher reissued the album May 5, 2017. Steve Fisk returned to mix the album for its first vinyl release. The initial 1,000 copies will be released on clear vinyl. The new pressing and future vinyl pressings include four bonus tracks: "Bitter Honey" and "234" from the original sessions, a previously unreleased version of their cover of Can's "Yoo Doo Right" predating the version on the album Butch and featuring both Daniel Keenan and Nels Cline on guitars, and a new song "Thank You For Giving Me Life" with Bozulich, Cline, Tutton, Fitzgerald and Moss as the lineup.

Track listing

Personnel
The Geraldine Fibbers
Carla Bozulich – guitar, vocals
Kevin Fitzgerald – banjo, drums
Jessy Greene – viola, violin
Daniel Keenan – guitar
William Tutton – bass

Additional personnel
Mark Brooks – art direction
Steve Fisk – mixing, piano, production
Dave Franklin – composition
John Goodmanson – engineering, mixing
Rob Groome – engineering
Sam Hoffstead – engineering
Jean Krikorian – design
Len Peltier – art direction
Eddy Schreyer – mastering
Irving Taylor – composition

References

Geraldine Fibbers albums
1995 debut albums
Virgin Records albums
Albums produced by Steve Fisk